The sWaP Classic is an unlocked tri-band watch phone. It has a multimedia player and recorder for music (mp3) and video (mp4), a WAP 2.0 web browser, a 1.3MP camera, basic handwriting recognition and an e-reader that supports only text files.

Comes with a 2GB SD card. It has a Phone Book with up to 500 Entries. It can be connected to a computer through a USB cable and the swappable SD card will be recognized as a mass storage device for file management.

As a phone, it can be used in conjunction with a Bluetooth headset and can operate in a hands free manner, also its Bluetooth functionality supports stereo Bluetooth for wireless music playing. It offers a talk-time of up to 200 minutes and up to 110 hours on standby.

sWaP released a new model called the sWaP Rebel in December 2010.

References

External links
 Official Web Site
 sWaP Classic
 SWAP Classic: Smart Watch And Phone
 Amazon.co.uk
 Swap Rebel watch phone laughs at your wrist-mounted iPod nano

Watch phones